The Queen Elizabeth II Centre is a conference facility located in the City of Westminster, London, close to the Houses of Parliament, Westminster Abbey, Central Hall Westminster and Parliament Square.

History
The site now occupied by the Queen Elizabeth II Centre was previously occupied by several buildings. At the northern end of the site were the headquarters of the Stationery Office, which had originally been the "Parliamentary Mews" built in 1825 by Decimus Burton and converted from 1853 to 1855. The southern side was occupied by the Westminster Hospital, built by W & H W Inwood from 1831 to 1834, and expanded later that century and again in 1924. The previous buildings became surplus to requirements in 1950 and were demolished; designs were drawn up by Thomas Tait for building a new Colonial Office on the site; however only the foundations had been built by the time progress was halted in 1952.

Design
In 1958, it was decided that there would be an open space on the southern edge of the site by Broad Sanctuary, and an architectural competition for a conference hall and government offices was held in 1961. The competition was won by William Whitfield, but the scheme was not executed due to the plans for redeveloping Whitehall drawn up by Leslie Martin in 1965. The site remained in limbo until a feasibility study for the conference centre was drawn up in 1975. The centre as eventually built was designed by Powell Moya & Partners and constructed by Bovis Construction with work starting in 1981; it was opened by Queen Elizabeth II in 1986.

Operation
The centre is owned by HM Government and its operation is conducted by an executive agency of the Department for Levelling Up, Housing and Communities. It has 32 versatile "empty box" style rooms which are suitable for a range of events. It specialises in events for between 40 and 1,300 delegates. It also has 2,000 square metres of exhibition space. The centre is a very successful venue hosting over 400 meetings each year and returning an annual dividend to the Exchequer, thus not reliant on the taxpayer for financial support. It has been used as the venue to announce the new Leader of the Conservative Party in 2019 and 2022.

See also
 Alexandra Palace
 The Business Design Centre
 The ExCeL Exhibition Centre
 Olympia, London

References

External links

 

Exhibition and conference centres in London
Buildings and structures in the City of Westminster
National government buildings in London
Department for Levelling Up, Housing and Communities
Executive agencies of the United Kingdom government
Trading funds of the United Kingdom government
Government buildings completed in 1986
1986 establishments in England
Tourist attractions in the City of Westminster
Modernist architecture in London